The A6 road is a federal road in Sabah.

Malaysian Federal Roads
Roads in Sabah